Lindsey Chukwufumnanya Abudei, known professionally as Lindsey Abudei, is a Nigerian neo-soul singer and songwriter. She started recording music and having jam sessions with M.I Abaga and Jesse Jagz while still an undergraduate law student in 2014. Abudei has released three solo projects; Brown: The EP (2013), ...And the Bass Is Queen (2016), and Kaleidoscope (2023).

Early life and education
A native of the Igbo-speaking part of Delta State, Nigeria, Abudei was born and raised in Jos. She attained a law degree from the University of Jos but decided to pursue a career in music after graduating. Abudei was born to parents who were involved in music during their early years. She chose to make neo-soul and R&B music after listening to artists such as Stevie Wonder, Roberta Flack, Sade, Prince, Nat King Cole, R.E.M. Skeeter Davis, Andy Williams, The Beach Boys and Omar Lye-Fook.

Career

2004–10: Early beginnings and Project Fame West Africa
In 2004, Abudei started recording music with MI, Jesse Jagz and Ruby Gyang (who were at the time under Loopy Records) while still an undergraduate student at the University of Jos. In 2010, she auditioned for the third season of Project Fame West Africa. Although she exited the platform as an early evictee, she managed to attract a devoted fanbase. Abudei had a brief stint with The Jazzcats, a jazz band. She lent vocals to M.I's "Jehovah", a track from his debut studio album Talk About It. She also lent vocals to DJinee's "Thank You" and Jesse Jagz's "This Jagged Life".

2011–13: Brown: The EP
Abudei's 8-track EP Brown was released independently on 24 February 2013. Stylized as Brown: The EP, it contains three bonus tracks and was produced by Atta Lenell, Jesse Jagz and IBK. Brown was supported by the previously released singles "Drift Away", "The 90s Song" and "Out the Magazine". It also contains cover versions of Aṣa's "Jailer" and Fela Kuti's "Trouble Sleep, Yanga Go Wake Am".

2014–present: ...And The Bass Is Queen and Kaleidoscope
Abudei started recording her debut studio album ...And the Bass Is Queen in 2014. She shot the music video for "Out the Magazine" with Kemi Adetiba in 2015. On 25 June 2016, she unveiled the album's artwork on Twitter and announced that it would comprise 12 tracks. In 2017, Abudei got into a music residency in New York and became an Art OMI Music Fellow.

Abudei recorded "Abụ Ya", an acoustic solo that appeared on Brymo's seventh studio album Yellow (2020). Prior to recording  "Abụ Ya", she released two singles in four years. On 3 April 2020, Abudei released the alternative ballad "One on the Outside".

Abudei's second extended play, titled Kaleidoscope, was released to coincide with her thirty-six birthday on 6 February 2023. Produced by Abudei and Bigfoot, the EP combines elements of electronic music and classical music. Abudei said she wrote the EP while experiencing different emotions, including feelings of doubt and loss. She also said that each song on the EP, excluding the intro, is accompanied by an intermission. Kaleidoscope was written as a soundscape for visual and performance presentations.

Artistry and influences
Abudei's music is a mixture of neo soul and alternative music. Her sound has been described as everything from "songbird to songstress, sultry to sonorous, emotion evoking to even effortlessly earth-moving". She has cited Stevie Wonder, Norah Jones, Sade, Eva Cassidy, and Roberta Flack as her key musical influences.

Discography
Brown: The EP (2013)
...And The Bass Is Queen (2016)
Kaleidoscope (2023)

References

External links

1987 births
Living people
21st-century Nigerian women singers
Nigerian women singer-songwriters
Neo soul singers
English-language singers from Nigeria
Musicians from Plateau State
People from Delta State
University of Jos alumni
Nigerian women lawyers
Nigerian record producers